Andrés Montemar Soriano Jr. (May 3, 1926 – March 19, 1984) was a Spanish Filipino businessman best known as the chief executive of San Miguel Corporation and A. Soriano Corporation (ANSCOR) from 1964 to 1984. He was a son of Andrés Soriano Sr.

Education
Soriano studied in the United States. He attended Lawrenceville School in New Jersey and the Wharton School of Finance at the University of Pennsylvania, where he obtained a bachelor's degree in economics.

Involvement in football
Soriano would inherit his father's advocacy in Philippine football, continuing San Miguel Corporation's (SMC) football programs. Succeeding  Luis Javellana, he would become the longest serving president of the Philippine Football Association holding the position from 1969 to 1981. He would complement the PFA with support from SMC and would fund various programs including the grassroots program initiated by German Bernhard Zgoll. His support ended when he handed SMC over to Eduardo Cojuangco Jr. due to his detoriating health.

Death 
Soriano died on March 19, 1984, at his residence in Madrid, Spain. He was 58 years old.

References

1926 births
1984 deaths
20th-century Filipino businesspeople
Filipino philanthropists
San Miguel Corporation people
Lawrenceville School alumni
Wharton School of the University of Pennsylvania alumni
20th-century philanthropists
Filipino people of Spanish descent
Presidents of the Philippine Football Federation